The 2018–19 season is Oldham Athletic's 124th season in their history and first season back in the fourth tier since the 1970–71 season following relegation the previous season. Along with competing in League Two, the club will also participate in the FA Cup, EFL Cup and EFL Trophy.

The season covers the period from 1 July 2018 to 30 June 2019.

Transfers

Transfers in

Transfers out

Loans in

Loans out

Competitions

Pre-season friendlies
The Latics confirmed pre-season friendlies with Ashton United, Curzon Ashton, FC United of Manchester, Nottingham Forest and Preston North End.

League Two

League table

Results summary

Results by matchday

Matches

FA Cup

The first round draw was made live on BBC by Dennis Wise and Dion Dublin on 22 October. The draw for the second round was made live on BBC and BT by Mark Schwarzer and Glenn Murray on 12 November. The third round draw was made live on BBC by Ruud Gullit and Paul Ince from Stamford Bridge on 3 December 2018. The fourth round draw was made live on BBC by Robbie Keane and Carl Ikeme from Wolverhampton on 7 January 2019.

EFL Cup

On 15 June 2018, the draw for the first round was made in Vietnam.

EFL Trophy
On 13 July 2018, the initial group stage draw bar the U21 invited clubs was announced. The draw for the second round was made live on Talksport by Leon Britton and Steve Claridge on 16 November.

References

Oldham Athletic
Oldham Athletic A.F.C. seasons